Louise Sneed Hill (ca. June 30, 1862 – March 28, 1955) was a society leader in Denver, Colorado in the 19th century. She was the wife of Crawford Hill and daughter-in-law of senator and mining executive Nathaniel P. Hill. She created the first list of socialites in Denver, called the Who's Who in Denver Society, now called the Blue Book. She entertained with lavish parties and card games for an elite group called the Sacred 36.

Early years

Louise Sneed was born in Townsville, North Carolina at about the start of the American Civil War. Her parents were William Morgan Sneed and Louise (Bethell) Sneed. Her mother died July 11, 1862, 11 days after giving birth to Louise. The Sneeds had a total of six children, two males were serving in the American Civil War at the time of her death. She was educated in New York City at St. Mary's School on 46th Street. It was an Episcopal boarding and day school offering primary, preparatory, and collegiate education for young ladies. It also provided preparation for foreign travel. Her father died December 10, 1891 near Townsville. After both of her parents had died, she went to live with an older sister in Memphis, Tennessee. In 1893, she came to Denver to visit cousins at Bethell mansion on Capitol Hill, where she met Crawford Hill, the son of Senator Nathaniel P. Hill.

Marriage and children

Crawford and Louise were married in Memphis in 1895. Sensing that her daughter-in-law was making a power play, Alice Hale Hill said that she was "sick over Crawford's marriage".

The Hills moved into an apartment at La Veta Place in downtown Denver, on the present site of the City and County building. They had two sons there, Nathaniel and Crawford, Jr.

Denver society
Hill began her quest to remedy what she saw as a "social wasteland" and to become a member of Denver society, following and surpassing the footsteps of her mother-in-law. The Hills built Crawford Hill Mansion at Tenth and Sherman Streets in 1905. Hill invited those who she considered to be the best of Denver's high society to play whist or bridge at the mansion. The group was made up of an elite group of 36 women for nine tables of four people. This group became known as the Sacred 36. Margaret Brown wanted to be part of the group, but never was invited because of her improper grammar and boisterous demeanor. She labeled Hill "the snobbiest woman in Denver". Later, when Brown became a national figure as The Unsinkable Molly Brown, following the RMS Titanic disaster, she was then let into the Hill mansion.

Hill entertained in style, wearing haute couture clothing, with the best people of Denver, the international set, and royalty. She used the best caterers and the best orchestras. Seeking publicity, she courted journalists and sent gifts to those who wrote about her parties.

She created the first published record of members of society in 1908 with the Who's Who in Denver Society. To be included on  the list, one must have money and know how to entertain. It has evolved to the Blue Book of wealthy people from Denver. She provided information, such as the proper hours for calling, rules for the calling card, the high tea, the wedding journey, and how to get into society.

Hill traveled to New York City, to Newport, Rhode Island, and to Paris. While in England, she was presented at the court of King Edward VII. During this audience, she wore a satin gown embroidered with diamonds and had a red velvet cape trimmed in 14-karat gold. She became the first person in Denver to entertain a president when William Howard Taft visited. He was met by a red carpet, an orchestra, and Hill's sons wearing white satin suits. She was politically active, involved in Republican Party women's clubs. Her sons married and moved to Newport, where she visited them. She continued to travel to Paris, London, and New York City.

Bulkeley Wells

She met Bulkeley Wells (also seen as "Buckeley"), a polo-playing socialite, around 1914. He was a general in the Colorado National Guard and had mining interests in the state. They became involved in a love affair, which Crawford seemed to tolerate. The three of them often dined together and at times traveled together. Louise hung pictures of both men in the foyer of the mansion, Wells having the larger of the two pictures. The younger Wells was married with four children. His wife, Grace Livermore Wells, divorced him in 1918. As a result of the divorce, Wells lost $15 million in mining interests and the financing he received from his wife's family.

Crawford Hill died in 1922, and Hill assumed that Wells would marry her, but he eloped with a woman from Nevada. Determined to "break him", she persuaded his remaining financial backer, Harry Payne Whitney, to withdraw his support. He lost his mining empire and gas and oil speculations. He gambled and lost the last of his money. He was on the verge of bankruptcy when he committed suicide in 1931.

Later years
She lived in the mansion until World War II when it became difficult to hire domestic servants. She sold it in 1942 and moved into a suite in the Brown Palace Hotel. She led a quiet life until her death on May 28, 1955. She is buried at Fairmount Cemetery next to Crawford in the Hill family plot. After her death, there was no longer an interest in the flashy entertaining performed by Hill, nor the concept of society as Hill saw it. Local historian Caroline Bancroft said "There is no Society in Denver anymore".

Notes

References

External links
 Sneed Plantation, near Townsville / Williamsboro, North Carolina

1955 deaths
People from Denver
American socialites
Year of birth uncertain